The Modern School (informally Modern School or Modern) is an independent day-cum-boarding school in New Delhi, India founded in 1920 by Lala Raghubir Singh, a prominent Delhi philanthropist and businessman. The first principal was Mrs. Kamala Bose who moved from Calcutta to head the school. The best known alumnus is former Indian Prime Minister Indira Gandhi.

Note: The sub-headings are given as a general guide and some names might fit under more than one category

Government

Prime Ministers 
 Indira Gandhi, Prime Minister of India

Cabinet Ministers 
 Arun Shourie, Minister of Communications and Information Technology (IT)

Chief Ministers & Governors 
 Gopal Krishna Gandhi, Governor of West Bengal and Bihar

Members of Parliament and Legislative Assemblies 
 Rahul Gandhi, Member of Parliament and General Secretary, Indian National Congress (completed RSJMS and transferred)
Priyanka Gandhi, General Secretary, Eastern Uttar Pradesh, All India Congress Committee
 Sandeep Dikshit, Member of Parliament and Member, Indian National Congress (INC)
 Varun Gandhi, Member of Parliament and National Secretary, Bharatiya Janta Party (completed RSJMS and transferred)
Raghav Chadha, National Treasurer and National Spokesperson of the Aam Adami Party

Diplomats and Bureaucrats 
 Kamlesh Sharma, Indian High Commissioner to the United Kingdom

Judiciary 
 Bhupinder Nath Kirpal, Chief Justice of India
 Sanjay Kishan Kaul, Judge, Supreme Court of India
 Sanjiv Khanna, Judge, Supreme Court of India
 Madan B. Lokur, Judge, Supreme Court of India
Mukul Rohatgi, Attorney General of India

Armed Forces

Indian Air Force 

Subhash Bhojwani, Air Marshal, Indian Air Force
Pratap Chandra Lal, Chief of Air Staff, Indian Air Force
Surinder Mehra, Chief of Air Staff, Indian Air Force

Indian Army 
 Sonam Wangchuk, Colonel, Indian Army and recipient of the Maha Vir Chakra for his actions in the Kargil War
 Vijay Lall, Lt General, Indian Army

Business 
Ajay Bijli, Managing Director and Chairman, PVR Cinemas
Gurcharan Das, CEO, Procter & Gamble
Rajat Gupta, Managing Director, McKinsey & Company and Founder, Indian School of Business
Rakesh Kapoor, CEO, Reckitt Benckiser
Surinder Mehta, Founder of Prime Group
Atul Punj, Chairman, Punj Lloyd Group
Bharat Ram, Chairman and Managing Director, Delhi Cloth & General Mills
Ashwajit Singh, Founder and Managing Director, IPE Global Limited

Journalism 
 Barkha Dutt, Television Reporter & Journalist, Tiranga TV 
 Pallavi Aiyar, China Bureau Chief, The Hindu

Literature

Non-Fiction 
 Valmik Thapar, Naturalist, Conservationist, and Writer

Fiction, Poetry and Drama 
 Amitava Kumar, Novelist, Journalist, and Helen D. Lockwood Chair of English at Vassar College
 Khushwant Singh, Novelist, Columnist, Member of Parliament (Rajya Sabha), and former Editor of The Illustrated Weekly of India, The National Herald, and The Hindustan Times

Arts

Fine & Performing Arts 
Anuradha Kapur, director, National School of Drama  
Geeta Kapur, art critic and art historian
Yamini Reddy, Indian classical dancer and Kuchipudi exponent

Architecture & Design 
 Ratish Nanda, architect, conservationist, and project director, Aga Khan Trust for Culture, India
 Aman Nath, founder, INTACH and co-founder and chairman, Neemrana Hotels
 Rajeev Sethi, designer, scenographer and art curator, Padma Bhushan, India

Films and entertainment 
Abhishek Bachchan, actor
Mallika Dua, actress and comedian
Priyamvada Kant, actress
Shekhar Kapur, filmmaker
Gauri Khan, film producer & interior designer
 Kabir Khan, filmmaker
 Sanjana Sanghi, actress
Amrita Singh, actress
Karan Soni, Indian born American actor
Arjit Taneja, actor

Music 
 Amjad Ali Khan, sarod maestro
 Ayaan Ali Khan & Amaan Ali Khan, sarod players
 Madhup Mudgal, Indian classical vocalist

Education 
 Syeda Saiyidain Hameed, former member of the Planning Commission of India, former Chancellor of Maulana Azad National Urdu University, Padma Shri awardee
Radha Kumar, Indian feminist and founder, Delhi Policy Group
 Sunita Narain, director general, Centre for Science and Environment
 Sriram Ramaswamy, former Director of the Tata Institute of Fundamental Research (TIFR) Centre for Interdisciplinary Sciences in Hyderabad.
Kiran Seth, Professor Emeritus at Indian institute of Technology, Delhi, and founder of SPIC MACAY

Life Science and Medicine 
 Aditi Shankardass, neuroscientist
 Noshir Minoo Shroff, ophthalmologist and founder, Shroff Eye Hospital
 Arvinder Singh Soin, liver-transplant surgeon
 Naresh Trehan, surgeon and chairman, Medicity

Sports

Cricket 
Kirti Azad, Indian international cricketer
Unmukt Chand, Indian cricketer
Gautam Gambhir, Indian international cricketer & Member of Parliament, Bhartiya Janta Party
 Surendra Nath, Indian test cricketer
 Himmat Singh, cricketer for Royal Challengers Bangalore

Golf 
Daniel Chopra, professional golfer
Gaurav Ghei, professional golfer

Shooting 
Samaresh Jung, Indian sport shooter
Ronjan Sodhi, Indian double trap shooter

Tennis 
Vishal Uppal, Indian tennis player

Athletics 
Sharad Kumar, Paralympic Bronze medalist

Chess 
 Tania Sachdev, chess player and commentator

References

Modern School alumni